The Potamoi were Greek river gods.

Potamoi may also refer to:
Potamoi (Bithynia), a town of ancient Bithynia
Potamoi (Paphlagonia), a town of ancient Paphlagonia
Potamoi, Drama, in Greece